The Casablanca Tramway ( Ṭrāmwāy ad-Dār al-Bayḍā’) is a low-floor tram system in Casablanca, Morocco. , it consists of two lines - T1 from Sidi Moumen to Lissasfa, and T2 from Sidi Bernoussi to Aïn Diab—which intersect at 2 points and form a  network with 71 stations. Two additional lines, T3 and T4, are scheduled to open in 2024.

History
The Casablanca Tramway is the second modern tram system in Morocco, after the Rabat–Salé tramway, but is longer and has more stations.

It was first inaugurated by King Muhammad VI on 12 December 2012. At that time, it consisted of one  Y-shaped line with 48 stops, connecting Sidi Moumen in the east with Ain Diab and the  district in the west. The line forked toward Ain Diab and Facultés after Abdelmoumen Station.

A second line was opened on 24 January 2019. It connects Sidi Bernoussi to Ain Diab, using the segment of the previously existing line from the split to Ain Diab. Line 1 was also extended from Facultés to Lissasfa.

Construction
Project management on the first line was provided by Casablanca Transports en Site Aménagé ("Casa Transports"), a limited company created for the purpose in March 2009. Stakeholders were the Ministry of Finance & the Interior, local government (the Grand Casablanca regional government, the Casablanca  and Casablanca urban commune), and several institutional investors (King Hassan II, CDG Capital, Banque Populaire du Maroc, and ONCF). Casa Transports awarded the construction contract to a global group headed by the French group Systra. Project support was subcontracted to the Spanish group Ayesa Tecnología.

Preparatory work started in 2009, with the construction of the first line starting in 2010. The line was inaugurated on 12 December 2012 by King Mohammed VI, with French Prime Minister Jean-Marc Ayrault in attendance. Commercial services started the next day.

Current network

Line T1
, Line 1 of the Casablanca Tramway serves 36 stations between termini in Sidi Moumen and Lissasfa. It opened in December 2012 and was extended in January 2019.

Line T2 
, the  Line T2 runs from Ain Diab to Sidi Bernoussi, via the Ain Sebaa, Hay Hassani, Al Fida and Derb Sultan districts. It uses the segment from the split to Ain Diab in the previous configuration, in addition to the new line.

Operation
Travel time between termini is around 69 minutes from Facultés and 77 minutes from Hay Hassani. On weekdays, the tramway runs from 06:30 to 22:00 at weekends it runs from 06:30 to 23:30. Service averages were planned to be every  minutes in peak hours and  minutes off-peak.

Casa Transport awarded a five-year contract to operate the tramway to the CasaTram consortium of RATP Group,  and Transinvest as partners. In January 2016 RATP Group became the sole shareholder.

Following a competitive tender process, RATP Group was awarded a further contract until December 2029 having beaten bids from a National Express / ALSA / ONCF consortium and Transdev.

Engie Ineo and Engie Cofely Morocco supplied signaling and other systems for Line 2 as well as an extension of Line 1.

Rolling stock
The tramway is operated by 74 Alstom Citadis type 302 low-floor trams, built by Alstom in France. The final assembly was completed in Reichshoffen, Alsace. Trams have air conditioning and tinted windows, and an information system in both Arabic and French. A further 50 are to be delivered in 2018 to operate Line T2.

In July 2017, Alstom, Bombardier / CAF, CRRC Zhuzhou Locomotive and Škoda Transportation were shortlisted to bid for a contract for 100 trams for Lines T3 and T4.

Fares
Ticket prices are subsidised by the Moroccan government and the city of Casablanca, and set at a flat rate of 6 dirhams per journey, with a weekly season ticket at 60 dirhams and a monthly season ticket at 230 dirhams. Fares are paid by a paper smart card at turnstiles on each station platform. Students get a reduced monthly season ticket of 150 dirhams. A combined tram and bus fare is being considered.

Usage
A survey in June 2013 recorded  commuters. By 2013, the tramway had met its objectives by carrying over  passengers a day. From 2015,  passengers a day are expected on Line T1.

Incidents
Tramway operations have resulted in many accidents: in the first 13 months, 180 accidents were reported.

 On 1 April 2013, a lorry hit a tramcar at full speed. Both the lorry and tram drivers were injured, according to a witness. The impact was so hard that part of the tram was derailed.
 On 2 August 2013, a man was crushed to death.
 Two days later on 4 August 2013, a motorcyclist was hit by a tram and died.
 On 14 January 2014, a man died after being hit by a tram.
 On 24 April 2014, a 26-year-old woman was fatally injured by the tram.
 On 4 July 2014, a coach owned by a private firm failed to give way to the tram and struck it. Part of the tram was derailed.
On 13 January 2015, a rider who entered the tram platform died after being hit.
On 8 November 2017, two teenagers on a motorcycle were injured after hitting a tram line.
On 26 December 2017, two women were struck crossing the tramway and were injured.

Future

These lines will interchange with the now cancelled Casablanca Metro and the operational Al Bidaoui suburban railways. Casablanca will have a network totalling 76 route km ( route mi), costing 5.9 billion dirhams.

Lines T3 and T4
Long-term plans in the SDAU and PDU are for new lines T3 and T4 (.

Line T3 will connect the Sidi Othmane district to the El Hank district via the city centre to Casa-Port railway station, and T4 will connect the Sbata and Lissasfa districts via the Aïn Chock and the Facultés district.

See also
 Rabat–Salé tramway
 Rail transport in Morocco
 Template:Suburban railways in Africa

References

External links

 

Railway lines opened in 2012
RATP Group
Casablanca
Tram transport in Morocco
Transport in Casablanca
2012 establishments in Morocco